Joslin Sharif Bipfubusa (born 10 October 1984) is a Burundian football coach currently manager of Burundi.

Managerial career
Bipfubusa managed Burundi during the 2020 Bangabandhu Cup, following spells managing Aigle Noir and the Burundi under-20 team.

References

1984 births
Living people
Burundian sportsmen
Burundi national football team managers
Burundian football managers